Otto Happel (born 9 February 1948) is a Swiss-based German billionaire businessman, the former owner and CEO of GEA Group. As of October 2021, Forbes estimated his net worth at US$3.2 billion.

Early life
Happel received his PhD in engineering from RWTH Aachen University.

Career
In 1974, Happel became CEO of GEA Group, a small family business established by his father in 1920 with approximately Euro 100 million in revenues.

Over the next 25 years, he transformed GEA into a global system supplier and introduced machinery and plants for the food processing industry, power industry, air-conditioning and refrigeration industry. After making over 70 acquisitions, GEA had over 200 subsidiaries in 60 countries. In 1989 he took his company public at the Frankfurt stock exchange, but kept the majority of the voting stock in the family. By 1999, Happel had increased GEA's revenues to over €2.6 billion, as well as its net earnings proportionally.

In 1999 he merged his controlling stake with Germany's MG Technologies, remained the largest shareholder of the combined businesses and, once MG Technologies merged into GEA Group AG, sold his dominant stake to institutional investors in 2006. GEA Group AG is the largest listed German machinery manufacturer and is broadly diversified. In 2018, it accounted for revenues of approximately EUR 4,8 bn and employed approximately 18,600 people.

He was a member of the supervisory board at Commerzbank from May 1993 until April 2013.

Personal life
Happel is married, with six children, and lives in Lucerne, Switzerland.

References

1948 births
Living people
People from Bochum
People from Lucerne
RWTH Aachen University alumni
German billionaires
German chief executives
German expatriates in Switzerland
20th-century German businesspeople
21st-century German businesspeople